Standing Egg (Hangul: 스탠딩 에그; stylized as Standing EGG or STANDING EGG) is a South Korean indie acoustic pop band that debuted in 2010 under Von Entertainment. The band consists of three members, Egg 1, Egg 2, and Egg 3, who produce and compose the music. As they don't have a vocalist or musicians, they feature various guest indie artists like Clover (guitar, vocals), Windy (vocals), Han Gyul (double bass), or Hana (djembe) for their songs and performance.

Career
Standing Egg debuted with a self-titled album in 2010 that consisted of three songs. Doing no promotion, the album reached the public through the group's Twitter, as they used the account to share their music and jokingly asked one of their followers to create a music video for one of their songs, La La La. The follower agreed to the request and created a music video that quickly became popular and ranked on several music charts.

Their first full-length album, released in November 2010, climbed to the top of Melon Indie Music Chart, the equivalent of Billboard charts in the United States. Since then, they have consistently released an album and a few singles every year. Their latest album, VOICE, along with a music video for the eponymous title track, was released in November 2016.

Standing Egg is currently one of the most well-known Korean indies musicians, and notable for their ability to rank in music charts with few to no promotions.

Members
 Egg 1 (Hangul: 에그1호) — Composition
 Egg 2 (Hangul: 에그2호) — Composition, Vocal
 Egg 3 (Hangul: 에그3호) — Lyrics

Live performance team
 Windy (Hangul: 윈디) — Vocal
 Lee Ye-seul (Hangul: 이예슬) — Vocal
 Clover (Hangul: 클로버) — Vocal, Guitar
 Lee Ye-ni (Hangul: 이예니) — Keyboard
 Lee Han-kyul (Hangul: 이한결) — Double bass, Electric bass
 Song Ha-na (Hangul: 송하나) — Djembe, Percussion

Discography

Studio albums

Special albums

Extended plays

Singles

Collaborations

Soundtrack appearances

Awards and nominations

References

External links
 Standing Egg Official Website

South Korean pop music groups
Musical groups established in 2010
2010 establishments in South Korea
South Korean musical trios
Melon Music Award winners